Akio Johnson Mutek (January 2, 1958 – March 17, 2013) was the Roman Catholic bishop of the Roman Catholic Diocese of Torit, South Sudan.

Ordained to the priesthood in 1988, Mutek was named bishop in 1999 and died in office.

Notes

External links

1958 births
2013 deaths
21st-century Roman Catholic bishops in South Sudan
South Sudanese Roman Catholic bishops
Roman Catholic bishops of Torit